Baluchabad-e Sargorich (also Romanized as Balūchābād-e Sargorīch; also known as Balūchābād) is a village in Mehruiyeh Rural District, in the Central District of Faryab County, Kerman Province, Iran. At the 2006 census, its population was 216, in 43 families.

References 

Populated places in Faryab County